Daniela Tasch is an Austrian football midfielder. She currently plays for SV Neulengbach in the ÖFB-Frauenliga, and is also a member of the Austrian national team

References

1989 births
Living people
Austrian women's footballers
Austria women's international footballers
SV Neulengbach (women) players
Women's association football midfielders
ÖFB-Frauenliga players
DFC LUV Graz players